The Redwood Solar Cluster is a 100 MW photovoltaic power station that is located in Kern County, California. The final phase, named Redwood 4, was completed in March 2018, and is located 12 miles east of downtown Bakersfield. Redwood 4 is rated at 26 MW.

References

Solar power stations in California
Buildings and structures in Kern County, California